Petrovice is a municipality and village in Ústí nad Labem District in the Ústí nad Labem Region of the Czech Republic. It has about 900 inhabitants.

Administrative parts
The village of Krásný Les is an administrative part of Petrovice.

History
On 15 April 1759, the Battle of Peterswalde of the Seven Years' War took place here.

References

Villages in Ústí nad Labem District